Nordmøre (English: North-Møre) is a traditional district in the Norwegian county of Møre og Romsdal. The  area comprises the northern third of the county including the municipalities of Kristiansund, Averøy, Tingvoll, Surnadal, Aure, Halsa, Eide, Sunndal, Gjemnes, and Smøla. The only town in Nordmøre is Kristiansund.

Of these ten municipalities, three are located (mainly) on islands: Kristiansund, Averøy, and Smøla and seven lie on the coast (including between, adjacent to, or at the end of, fjords): Tingvoll, Surnadal, Aure, Halsa, Eide, Sunndal, and Gjemnes; no municipalities are completely landlocked.  Historically, the municipality of Rindal was part of the county and region, but it was transferred to Trøndelag county on 1 January 2019.

In the early Viking Age, before Harald Fairhair, Nordmøre was a petty kingdom whose ruler was known as the Mørejarl (literally: "Møre-Earl"). Then, Nordmøre also included the municipalities north and west of Orkdal municipality, Sør-Trøndelag.

Gallery

See also
Sunnmøre
Romsdal

References

 
Districts of Møre og Romsdal
Petty kingdoms of Norway